This is a list of adult nonfiction books that topped The New York Times Nonfiction Best Seller list in 1969.

See also

 New York Times Fiction Best Sellers of 1969
 1969 in literature
 Publishers Weekly list of bestselling novels in the United States in the 1960s

References

1969
.
1969 in the United States